NGC 3631 is a spiral galaxy located in the constellation Ursa Major. It is located at a distance of circa 35 million light years from Earth, which, given its apparent dimensions, means that NGC 3631 is about 60,000 light years across. It was discovered by William Herschel on April 14, 1789. It is a grand design spiral galaxy seen face on.

Characteristics 
NGC 3631 is a grand design spiral galaxy and features two principal spiral arms, which begin near the center. The two main arms branch into secondary arms with lower surface brightness. The galaxy shows moderate-to-high star formation rate and bright HII regions are present in all the arms. Halton Arp observed "straight arms", and an "absorption tube crossing from inside to outside of southern arm" and added the galaxy to his Atlas of Peculiar Galaxies. At inclination of 17 degrees, the galaxy is seen nearly face on.

The HI imaging shows the spiral arms distinguished well and HI is also detected in most of the interarm regions. The atomic hydrogen is detected mostly within the limits of the optical disc but also extends one and a half times the radius of the optical disk. The hydrogen forms streaming motions near the spiral arms. The gas features two anticyclonic and four cyclonic vortices, rotating with the spiral pattern. The anticyclones are caused by the differential rotation and the cyclones are the result of a high amplitude in the density wave. The centres of the anticyclones are located between the observed spiral arms and the cyclones lie close to the observed spirals.

NGC 3631 has weak diffuse X-ray emission. There are six candidates ultraluminous X-ray sources in disk of the galaxy, two which have an optical counterpart. The nucleus of the galaxy hosts a supermassive black hole with mass 107.4 (25 million) , based on Ks bulge luminosity.

Supernovae 
Four supernovae have been discovered in NGC 3631: SN 1964A (mag. 17), SN 1965L (mag. 15.95), SN 1996bu, and SN 2016bau. SN 1996bu was a type II supernova discovered on November 14, 1996 and reached peak visual magnitude 17.3. SN 2016bau was a type Ib supernova discovered before maximum light. It was also observed in radio waves by the VLA as a radio source with a flux density of 1.0 ± 0.03 mJy at 8.6 GHz.

Nearby galaxies 
NGC 3631 forms a small group with NGC 3657, which is part of the north Ursa Major groups, part of the Virgo Supercluster.

Gallery

References

External links 

Unbarred spiral galaxies
Ursa Major (constellation)
Ursa Major Cluster
3631
06360
34767
027